Lights Camera Dead is an American independent horror comedy film, directed by Indie filmmaker Tim Reaper and stars Richard Christy.

Plot
Lights Camera Dead is the tale of a die-hard filmmaker and an ever-so-pretentious screenwriter, who will stop at nothing to complete their self-proclaimed zombie masterpiece “The Music Box.” On production day 666, a fed-up cast and crew quit, shutting down production. But not for long... the fast, efficient filmmakers devise a plan to finish their flick... and there will be blood!

Cast
 Wes Reid as Ryan Black
 Amy Lollo as Kari Price
 J.C. Lira as Steven Didymus
 Monica Moehring as Melanie
 Coldon Martin	as Ted
 Ashby Brooks as T-Love
 Stephanie Caston as Kari's mother
 Richard Christy as The Composer
 Melanie Fox as Melanie's boss
 Meggie Hirsch as Audition 1
 Scott Johnson as Alan
 Lee Kallman as Audition 2
 John Patton as Redneck
 Rob Rozier as Redneck Audition
 Garrett Weeda as Patrick
 Hunter White as The Editor

Release
It was released in 2007 and was distributed by White Lighting Productions.

References

External links

2007 films
2007 horror films
American independent films
American comedy horror films
2000s comedy horror films
2007 comedy films
2000s English-language films
2000s American films